Fetching Cody is a 2005 Canadian drama/science-fiction film, written and directed by David Ray.

Location of Movie
The film takes place in Vancouver's Downtown Eastside.

Plot of Movie
The film follows the story of Art Frankel (played by Jay Baruchel), as he desperately tries to save his girlfriend Cody Wesson (Sarah Lind), who is in the hospital after an overdose on drugs.

Art discovers a time machine, and decides to use it to save Cody, by attempting to rewrite her past.

Supporting Cast
The film features local drag queen Robert Kaiser as Sabrina.

Cast

Reception
The movie received negative reviews.

 On review aggregator Rotten Tomatoes, the film holds a 0% rating score on five critical reviews.
 Joe Leydon of Variety described it as an "Ungainly mix of gritty street-life drama, perky teen romance, and seriocomic sci-fi time-tripping never jells."

References

External links

2005 films
English-language Canadian films
Films about time travel
Films shot in Vancouver
Films set in Vancouver
2000s science fiction drama films
Canadian science fiction drama films
2005 drama films
2000s English-language films
2000s Canadian films